was an early kabuki actor in Japan. He remains today one of the most famous of all kabuki actors and is considered one of the most influential. His many influences include the pioneering of the aragoto style of acting which came to be largely associated with Edo kabuki and with Danjūrō and his successors in the Ichikawa Danjūrō line.

Like many actors, Danjūrō also dabbled in playwriting, which he did under the haimyō (poetry name) Mimasuya Hyōgo. "Mimasu" (三升) is the name for the mon of the Ichikawa family; many actors in the Danjūrō line have since used "Mimasu" or "Sansho", an alternate reading of the same characters, as their haimyō.

Lineage
As the originator of the most celebrated and prestigious stage name in kabuki, there have been a great many descendants of Danjūrō I in the kabuki world, some of them quite famous and accomplished themselves. Danjūrō's father, Horikoshi Juzō, was not involved in the theatre, but was an otokodate, something of a street ruffian, but nevertheless a man very much a part of Edo popular urban culture; though not in the theatre himself, he may have been a patron of various types of performances, as well as of the closely related sex industry.

The sons of Danjūrō I were known as Ichikawa Danjūrō II and Ichikawa Sen'ya. The fourth Danjūrō was his grandson; the fifth his great-grandson. His great-great-grandsons, as well as their sons and grandsons were kabuki actors of the Ichikawa family as well. Danjūrō I also had a great many disciples.

A devout follower of Fudō Myōō, one of Japan's Thirteen Buddhas, Danjūrō was the first to perform as Fudō onstage, and founded the actors' guild Naritaya, named after the Fudō temple Narita Fudōson.

Life and career
Born in Japan's capital of Edo in 1660, he first performed at the age of 13 at the Nakamura-za, under the name Ichikawa Ebizō. The first to take the name Ebizō, he was thus the founder or originator of this prestigious actor lineage as well. This 1673 performance of Shitennō Ochigodachi, in which Ebizō played Sakata Kintoki marks not only his first performance, but also the first use of red and black striped makeup, now called kumadori, and thus the nascent origins of the aragoto style.

Two years later, taking the name Danjūrō, he performed in the first kabuki presentation based on the Tale of the Soga Brothers. The famous actor print seen here, though produced for a 1697 performance, depicts Danjūrō in the same role, that of Soga Gorō. Serving as playwright as well as actor, Danjūrō produced a number of works, several of which were early forms of plays extremely popular later in the Edo period and still performed today, though they have undergone great changes over the centuries. Two of these such plays are Narukami, written and premiered in 1684, and Shibaraku, in 1697.

The Genroku period marked the peak of Edo period extravagance and hedonism. Danjūrō was one of the most popular actors in Edo in this period, alongside Nakamura Shichisaburō I and Nakamura Denkurō I. The first aragoto performance in Kyoto was that of Genji Musha Homare no Seiriki in 1694; the following year, Danjūrō would be featured in the Edo hyōbanki, a popular publication ranking actors and performances, as jō-jō-kichi (上々吉, higher-higher-excellent) and his annual salary would reach 500 ryō.

Over the course of his career, Danjūrō performed in, and wrote, a great number of plays. Unlike many later actors, he was not particularly faithful to any one theater, and moved back and forth between them many times. He also performed alongside his son, Ichikawa Kuzō, who would later take his father's name and become Ichikawa Danjūrō II. Danjūrō is said to have also been the first kabuki actor to write haiku and to take a poetry name (haimyō).

While performing at the Ichimura-za on 24 March 1704, Danjūrō was stabbed and killed in his dressing room by fellow actor Ikushima Hanroku.

See also

 Shūmei
 Ichikawa Danjūrō – overview of name and succession
 Ichikawa Danjūrō XIII – current head of the line
 Ichikawa Danjūrō XII
 Ichikawa Ebizō XI

Notes

References
 Nussbaum, Louis Frédéric and Käthe Roth. (2005). Japan Encyclopedia. Cambridge: Harvard University Press. ; OCLC 48943301

External links
Ichikawa Danjūrō I at Kabuki21.com
Audio recording of Ichikawa Danjuro I's play Narukami at LostPlays.com 

1660 births
1704 deaths
Kabuki actors
Japanese murder victims
People murdered in Japan
People from Tokyo
Male actors from Tokyo
Actors from Chiba Prefecture
17th-century Japanese male actors
18th-century Japanese male actors